Parliamentary elections were held in Laos on 24 April 1960 to elect members of the National Assembly, the lower chamber of Parliament. The result was a victory for the Committee for the Defence of the National Interests, which won 34 of the 59 seats.

Results

References

Laos
Elections in Laos
1960 in Laos
Election and referendum articles with incomplete results